Yarkhushta ( (modern orthography) or Եարխուշտայ (classical/traditional orthography)) is an Armenian folk and martial dance associated with the highlands of the historical region of Sasun in Western Armenia. Yarkhushta belongs to a wider category of Armenian "clap dances" (ծափ-պարեր, tsap parer). The dance is performed by men, who face each other in pairs. The key element of the dance is a forward movement when participants rapidly approach one another and vigorously clap onto the palms of hands of dancers in the opposite row.

History and tradition
Yarkhushta is believed to have its origins in the early Middle Ages as it is mentioned in the works of Movses Khorenatsi, Faustus of Byzantium, and Grigor Magistros.

Yarkhushta has traditionally been danced by Armenian soldiers before combat engagements, partly for ritualistic purposes, and partly in order to cast off fear and boost battle spirit for more effective hand-to-hand combat.

Euphorigenic effect 

The tune of the dance is played intentionally very loudly by two zurna or pku hornpipes and one or more double-headed bass drums, each struck with a mallet and a stick from opposite sides of the drum's cylinder.

It has been demonstrated that the combination of hornpipe's high-frequency tone and the bass drums' deep, low-frequency beat create a combination of sounds with wide peak-to-peak amplitude that is capable of placing the dancers in the state of euphoric trance. This factor amplifies the effect of adrenaline/epinephrine rush that the dancing of yarkhushta usually produces.

Modern revival 
In modern-day Armenia, yarkhushta is popular in settlements populated by refugees from Sassoun after the Armenian genocide, especially in villages around the towns of Talin, Aparan, and Ashtarak. 

The dance was popularized in the late 1930s by Srbuhi Lisitsian who taught at the Yerevan Dance College. In 1957, the dance underwent further choreographic refinement by folk culture enthusiast Vahram Aristakesian and was performed by a folk dance troupe from the village of Ashnak.

The dance was revived in the 1980s by the folk group Maratuk and, later, by the folk ensemble Karin. There are attempts to introduce yarkhushta into curriculum of dances and songs of the Armenian Army. 

There are several poems and samples of visual art that touch on the theme of yarkhushta. Among them is the poem "Dance of Sassoun" («Սասունցիների պարը») by Gevorg Emin published in 1975. Yarkhushta also features prominently in the films Men («Տղամարդիկ», 1972) and Yarkhushta (2004), produced by Gagik Harutyunyan.

Gallery

Video links 
 Yarkhushta danced by Maratuk folk group
Yarkhushta danced by Karin folk group
The Yarkhushta tune (instrumental)

See also

Armenian dance
Armenian music

References

Dance
Armenian dances
Folk dances